Kendall Gretsch (born April 2, 1992) is an American triathlete, biathlete and cross-country skier. She was born with spina bifida. She has competed in both Summer Paralympics and Winter Paralympics and has a unique distinction of winning gold medals in both Summer Paralympics and Winter Paralympics.

Education 

Gretsch studied at Washington University in St. Louis where she earned a degree in Bio Medical Engineering. She was a member of Alpha Omicron Pi sorority.

Career

2018 Winter Paralympics 
Gretsch made her Paralympic debut at the 2018 Winter Paralympics and created history in her maiden Paralympic appearance after claiming a gold medal in the women's 6km sitting biathlon event. She eventually became the first American to claim a medal in a biathlon event in either the Olympics or the Paralympics. Her medal was also the first gold medal achieved by the United States at the 2018 Winter Paralympics in the opening day of the multi-sport event.

Gretsch also repeated her gold medal hunt at the 2018 Winter Paralympics after emerging as the winner in the women's 12km sitting event which is a part of the cross-country skiing event. This was her second Paralympic gold medal and the first gold medal that she achieved in cross-country skiing.

Gretsch was one of two Paralympic gold winners representing the United States, the other being Daniel Cnossen, the first male biathlete to achieve a medal in either the Olympics or the Paralympics.

2020 Summer Paralympics 
Gretsch made her debut Summer Paralympics appearance representing United States at the 2020 Summer Paralympics in paratriathlon event and it also marked her second Paralympic appearance after featuring in 2018 Winter Paralympics. She went onto clinch her first Summer Paralympic medal in her maiden Summer Paralympic appearance. She became a Paralympic champion in the women's PTWC paratriathlon event whereas she notably defeated reigning world champion Lauren Parker of Australia to claim gold medal in the relevant competition.

She also became the fifth American and third American woman to have clinched gold medals in both Summer Paralympics and Winter Paralympics.

2021 World Para Snow Sports Championships 

She won the gold medal in the women's 7.5km sitting cross-country skiing event at the 2021 World Para Snow Sports Championships held in Lillehammer, Norway. She also won gold medals in the women's 10km sitting biathlon event and in the women's Individual sitting biathlon event. In cross-country skiing, she won the silver medal in the women's long-distance sitting event.

2022 Winter Paralympics 
She competed in the Women's 6 kilometres Biathlon seated, winning a bronze medal.

References

External links 
 
 
 
 

1992 births
Living people
American female biathletes
American female cross-country skiers
American female triathletes
Paralympic biathletes of the United States
Paralympic cross-country skiers of the United States
Paralympic gold medalists for the United States
Paralympic silver medalists for the United States
Paralympic bronze medalists for the United States
Biathletes at the 2018 Winter Paralympics
Biathletes at the 2022 Winter Paralympics
Cross-country skiers at the 2018 Winter Paralympics
Medalists at the 2018 Winter Paralympics
Medalists at the 2022 Winter Paralympics
Paralympic medalists in cross-country skiing
People from Downers Grove, Illinois
People with spina bifida
Sportspeople from DuPage County, Illinois
Paralympic medalists in biathlon
Paratriathletes at the 2020 Summer Paralympics
Paralympic medalists in paratriathlon
Medalists at the 2020 Summer Paralympics
21st-century American women
Washington University in St. Louis alumni